John Conklin (born  June 22, 1937) is an international theater designer, dramaturg and teaches in the Department of Design for Stage and Film at New York University's Tisch School of the Arts.

Life and career
John Conklin was born in Hartford Connecticut, and educated at the Kingswood-Oxford School and Yale University.

In New York City, he has designed for the Metropolitan Opera; the New York City Opera; the New York Shakespeare Festival; Broadway and off-Broadway productions. He has designed for other U.S. opera companies, including the San Francisco Opera and the Chicago Lyric Opera; Glimmerglass Opera; Opera Theatre of St. Louis; Santa Fe Opera; Seattle Opera; and the opera companies of Houston, Dallas, San Diego, Washington, and Boston. Regional theaters where he has worked include the American Repertory Theatre, the Goodman Theatre (Chicago), the Long Wharf Theatre, Hartford Stage, Arena Stage, the Guthrie Theatre, Center Stage (Baltimore), and Actors Theatre of Louisville.

Conklin has designed extensively on Broadway, receiving a Tony award nomination (1974) for set design of The Au Pair Man. He received the Robert L.B. Tobin Award for Lifetime Achievement in Theatrical Design from the Theatre Development Fund (2008).

In Europe he has designed for the English National Opera; the Royal Opera, Stockholm and the opera companies of Munich, Amsterdam, and Bologna. In 1991 he designed the costumes for Robert Wilson's production of the Magic Flute at the Bastille Opera in Paris.

In 2008 he retired from his position as Associate Artistic Director for the Glimmerglass Opera, a post he had held for eighteen years. He is the artistic advisor for Boston Lyric Opera where his  work has included Lucia de Lammermoor (2005) and Brittens's A Midsummer Night's Dream (2011). Reviewing the latter production, the Boston Globe described the scenery as "by turns abstract, stylized, whimsical, and deconstructed."

At BLO he also works to develop new supplemental performances, lecture series, and community events. Conklin is on the faculty of the Tisch School of the Arts at New York University where he teaches courses in design for stage and film.

References
Notes

External links
 Glimmerglass Opera
 
 Tisch School of the Arts
 John Conklin interview by Bruce Duffie, January 6, 1995

Living people
1937 births
American scenic designers
Yale School of Drama alumni
Tisch School of the Arts faculty
Opera designers